Nankai is a family of schools in China founded by Yan Xiu (严范孙) (1860–1920) and Zhang Boling (张伯苓) (1876–1951).  The schools include:  

 Nankai High School in Tianjin (天津南开中学) (1904).
 Nankai University in Tianjin (南开大学) (1919).
 The Nankai Women's High School (1923), Tianjin Second Nankai High School (天津第二南开中学) (present).
 The Nankai Elementary School in Tianjin (天津南开小学) (1928, ruined in WW2).
 Nanyu High School (1935), Chongqing Nankai Secondary School (重庆南开中学) (1936).
 Chongqing Nankai Elementary School (重庆南开小学) (1937).
 Shuguang Middle School in Zigong (自贡蜀光中学) (1937).
 Nankai University Affiliated High School (南开大学附中) (1954).

Nankai District (南开区, Nán-kāi Qū) in the city of Tianjin is named after Nankai schools.  The flagship school, Nankai University, and the original Nankai High School are still located there.

Resources.  
Nankai University
Tianjin Nankai High School
Chongqing Nankai Middle School
 Campus real three-dimensional map
A Brief History of “Nankai School”

Schools in China
Education in Tianjin